Unicity Mall was an enclosed shopping mall in Winnipeg, Manitoba. It was named for the 1972 unicity restructuring of city management.

Originally known as Unicity Fashion Square when it opened in September 1975, the mall was anchored by a Woolco and The Bay, and was one of only three malls in the city, along with Polo Park and Grant Park Shopping Centre. Managed by Trizec Corporation, the mall initially prospered despite one wing being almost completely empty. The food court's McDonald's was the first to be placed inside a mall in western Canada.

Today, the mall has been redeveloped into the Unicity Shopping Centre, a commercial site with individual buildings.

History 
Unicity Mall was opened in September 1975 as Unicity Fashion Square, and was anchored by a Woolco and The Bay, and was one of only three malls in the city, along with Polo Park and Grant Park Shopping Centre.

In the mid 1980s, the local economy was slowing down and the mall began losing tenants. By the 1990s, it was mostly empty and the vacated spaces were used for temporary flea markets. During that time, Woolco became Walmart, and extensive pressure was placed on the mall ownership for expansion of the Unicity Walmart location.

In April 1995, owner Bramalea Limited, which had 67% stake in the mall, became bankrupt after all its board of directors resigned. Markborough Properties of Toronto, which had owned a smaller portion of the mall, immediately took over management and leasing.

Despite various legal battles between store owners, local residents, and the new ownership, the mall was demolished to make way for a larger Walmart. Ownership was transferred to First Pro and the mall was subsequently demolished in 2000 and replaced with a SmartCentres big-box complex.

The Unicity Shopping Centre is now home to Walmart, Canadian Tire, Sobeys, Staples Canada, Winners, Sport Chek, Tim Hortons, KFC, Burger King, Shoppers Drug Mart, Value Village, Mark's, Quiznos, Bulk Barn and Dollar Tree among others.

References

Buildings and structures in Winnipeg
Defunct shopping malls in Canada
Shopping malls in Manitoba
Shopping malls established in 1975
Demolished buildings and structures in Canada
Buildings and structures demolished in 2000
St. James, Winnipeg